The Haomeiliao Wetland is a wetland in Budai Township, Chiayi County, Taiwan.

History
The wetland was declared a nature reserve in 1985 by the Construction and Planning Agency of the Ministry of the Interior. In 1987, a large portion of mangroves were cut down and the remaining have slowly died due to land subsidence. In 1998, the Executive Yuan designated the wetland to be a natural reserve area.

Geography
The wetland is located at Longgong Estuary and it spreads across 959 hectares of area.

See also
 Geography of Taiwan

References

Landforms of Chiayi County
Tourist attractions in Chiayi County
Wetlands of Taiwan